A Rolodex is a rotating card file device used to store business contact information. Its name, a portmanteau of the words rolling and index, has become somewhat genericized (usually as rolodex) for any personal organizer performing this function, or as a metonym for the total of an individual's accumulated business contacts. In this usage, it has generally come to describe an effect or characteristic of the small-world network of a business's investors, board of directors, or the value of a CEO's contacts, or in organizational structure. The Rolodex is iconic enough as a piece of ubiquitous business furniture that it has been shown in the Smithsonian.

History
The Rolodex was invented in 1956 by Danish engineer Hildaur Neilsen, the chief engineer of Arnold Neustadter's company Zephyr American, a stationery manufacturer in New York. Neustadter was often credited with having invented it. First marketed in 1958, it was an improvement to an earlier design called the Wheeldex. Zephyr American also invented, manufactured and sold the Autodex, a spring-operated phone directory that automatically opened to the selected letter; Swivodex, an inkwell that did not spill; Punchodex, a paper hole puncher; and Clipodex, an office aid that attached to a stenographer's knee. 
Rolodex also marketed non-rotary (linear) tub-like card-file systems using the same cards (size and notches) as the rotary files. 

Neustadter retired and sold out to a larger firm in 1970. As of 2023, Rolodex card files are still made.

Images

See also 

 Address book
 Contact list
 Microsoft Cardfile
 Customer relationship management

References

External links 
 

Products introduced in 1958
Newell Brands
Office equipment
Containers